The Marides (Greek: Μάρηδες) are a native Thracian tribe that is said to be originated from the ancient Thracians with their own clothing and language idioms, with their descendants living mainly in 13 villages in the northern part of the Prefecture of Evros in Greece.

Naming 
There is no official version of the origin of the name, but there are some unofficial versions. One of them considers that they are descendants of high priest Maron, while another claims that the word comes from the ancient Greek verb "μαρμαίρω" which means "shine", something that is directly related to their traditional costumes which literally shine from the ornaments.

Characteristics 
It is a completely separate Thracian tribe, with characteristics similar to those of the ancient Thracians. Even today it is a population group with strong internal cohesion. They have a common origin, historical origins, the same psychosynthesis and character, behavior, mentality, expression and pronunciation, customs and traditions and traditional clothing. Their society is dominated by the Thracian way of life, they are tied to their rich and genuine Thracian tradition, while until recently (around 1950) it was a completely closed society. It is characteristic that the vast majority of surnames end in "-idis" and "-oudis", which testifies to the close kinship ties. Up to the 1950s they did not exchange grooms and brides with other villages so "their race won't spoil".

References 

Thracians
Greek tribes
Thracian tribes